Sean Baker (born February 26, 1971) is an American film director, cinematographer, producer, screenwriter and editor. He is best known for the independent feature films Starlet, Tangerine, The Florida Project and Red Rocket, as well as his involvement in the Fox/IFC puppet sitcom Greg the Bunny and its spin-offs.

Baker has received several film critics awards, a Filmmaker on the Edge Award and nominations for six Independent Spirit Awards, winning one in 2012.

Early life and education 
Baker was born and raised in Summit, New Jersey.  His mother was a teacher and his father was a patent attorney who once represented the director and his production company in 2005. He has a sister who is a professional synth-pop musician and production designer who has contributed to his films in both capacities. He became obsessed with homemade movies at a young age when his mother took him to see Universal Monster films being projected at the local library. 

Baker graduated from Gill St. Bernard's High School in 1989.  He received his B.A. in film studies from New York University through the Tisch School of the Arts. Prior to NYU, he studied non-linear editing at The New School in Greenwich Village.

Career 
Baker's first feature film was Four Letter Words, a film revolving around the looks, views, attitudes and language of young men in America. Baker wrote, directed, and edited the film. Baker then went on to make Take Out, which he co-wrote, co-directed, co-edited, and co-produced with Shih-Ching Tsou on a budget of $3000. The film revolves around an illegal Chinese immigrant falling behind on payments on a smuggling debt, leaving him only one day to come up with the money. The film had its world premiere at the Slamdance Film Festival on January 18, 2004 and had been screened at over 25 film festivals when a legal dispute with Seth Landau, who was planning to release a film with the same name delayed its release until June 6, 2008. 

Baker's third feature film, Prince of Broadway, premiered at the Los Angeles Film Festival on June 22, 2008. The film follows a Ghanaian immigrant selling knock off merchandise in Manhattan who discovers that he has a son. Baker directed, wrote, co-produced, shot and edited the film. Baker also self-financed the distribution and advertising of the film. Take Out and Prince of Broadway were nominated for the Independent Spirit John Cassavetes Award at the same ceremony in 2008.

The director's fourth feature, Starlet, was co-written with Chris Bergoch, and stars Dree Hemingway and Besedka Johnson. Starlet explores the unlikely friendship between 21-year-old Jane (Hemingway) and 85-year-old Sadie (Johnson), two women whose lives intersect in California's San Fernando Valley. The film had its world premiere at SXSW on March 11, 2012, and was given a limited release on November 9, 2012.

Baker's fifth feature, Tangerine, follows a transgender sex worker who discovers her boyfriend and pimp has been cheating on her. The film was shot using three iPhone 5S smartphones and received praise for its groundbreaking filmmaking techniques. Tangerine features Kitana Kiki Rodriguez, Mya Taylor, Karren Karagulian, Mickey O'Hagan, and James Ransone, and was executive-produced by Mark Duplass and Jay Duplass. Baker again co-wrote the script with Bergoch; he also co-produced, co-shot, and edited the film. It had its world premiere at the 2015 Sundance Film Festival on January 23, 2015, and was given a limited release on July 10, 2015. It received extremely positive reviews, and currently holds a 97% rating on Rotten Tomatoes.

In 2016, he directed Snowbird, a short fashion film starring model Abbey Lee for Kenzo. It was also shot only using iPhones.

Baker's sixth feature, The Florida Project, premiered in the Directors' Fortnight section of the 2017 Cannes Film Festival, and was theatrically released in the United States on October 6, 2017, by A24. Once again, Baker edited the film himself and co-wrote the script with his frequent collaborator Chris Bergoch. The plot follows a 6-year-old girl living in a motel with her rebellious mother in Greater Orlando as they try to stay out of trouble and make ends meet. The film was praised for its performances (particularly that of Willem Dafoe as the motel manager and Brooklynn Prince as Moonie, a six-year-old girl) as well as for Baker's direction, and was chosen by both the National Board of Review and the American Film Institute as one of the top 10 films of the year. Dafoe earned Best Supporting Actor nominations at the Oscars, Golden Globes and BAFTA Awards, and Prince won the Critics Choice Movie Award for Best Young Performer.  

In June 2018, Baker was invited to be a member of the directors and writers branch of the Academy of Motion Picture Arts and Sciences. In October 2018, he was the head of the film jury at the Mumbai International Film Festival.

In August 2020, actress Bella Thorne announced that Baker would be directing a documentary about her experiences opening an OnlyFans account, but Baker quickly denied the rumor as Thorne's suspicious behavior was blamed for restrictions affecting all sex workers on the site.

In March 2021, Baker released short film Khaite FW21 produced for fashion line Khaite to promote its Fall/Winter 2021 lineup. Sean Price Williams served as cinematographer.

Baker's seventh feature film, Red Rocket, stars Simon Rex as Mikey, a pornographic actor returning to his hometown in Texas. Baker directed, co-wrote and co-produced the film with his usual team of Bergoch and Tsou among others. Filming took place in secret amidst the COVID-19 pandemic, but "industry-standard safety protocols" were observed. The film received a standing ovation at the 2021 Cannes Film Festival. It was released in the US by A24 on December 10.

In 2022, Baker directed a Taco Bell commercial. Baker executive-produced a documentary called Love in the Time of Fentanyl. It premiered at the DOXA Documentary Film Festival in May 2022.

Television 
Baker is also one of the original creators of the sitcom Greg the Bunny (2002-2006), starring Seth Green and Eugene Levy. The show is based on a series of short segments that Baker directed and wrote, which aired on the Independent Film Channel and which were in turn based on a public-access television show called Junktape. In 2010, Baker, Spencer Chinoy, and Dan Milano created a spinoff called Warren the Ape; the series aired on MTV and was canceled after one season.

Style and influences 
Baker has established a reputation for portraying outcasts and characters from underrepresented and marginalized subcultures, frequently undocumented immigrants and sex workers, in decidedly humane and compassionate scenarios. He claims to have been directly inspired by exploitation films but he has been described as the archetype of a "trustworthy male director" in a post Me Too era. His films have stirred and encouraged a debate about sexual morality.

Baker's influences include Ken Loach, Spike Lee, Jim Jarmusch, Mike Leigh,  Steven Spielberg,  Éric Rohmer, John Cassavetes, and Hal Ashby, among others.

Filmography

Film

Short film

Television

Accolades

References

External links 
 

Sean Baker on Twitter
Sean Baker on Letterboxd

Living people
Place of birth missing (living people)
Film directors from New Jersey
Film directors from New York (state)
Tisch School of the Arts alumni
American television directors
American television writers
Screenwriters from New Jersey
1971 births
American cinematographers
American film editors
Gill St. Bernard's School alumni
People from Summit, New Jersey